A constitutional referendum was held in French Sudan and Niger on 5 May 1946 as part of the wider French constitutional referendum. The proposed new constitution was rejected by 48% of voters in the two territories and by 53% of the overall vote. Voter turnout was 58%.

Results

References

1946 referendums
May 1946 events in Africa
Referendums in Mali
1946 in French Sudan
Referendums in Niger
1946 in Niger